Leptochilus cantoniensis is a species of fern in the family Polypodiaceae. It is endemic to China.  Its natural habitats are subtropical or tropical moist lowland forests and subtropical or tropical moist montane forests. It is threatened by habitat loss.

References

Polypodiaceae
Flora of China
Vulnerable plants
Taxonomy articles created by Polbot
Taxa named by John Gilbert Baker
Taxa named by Ren-Chang Ching